Good Fight Entertainment is a business conglomerate that was founded in 2010. The company consists of a record label, band management, sports management, a clothing line and an art studio. Good Fight was founded by Paul Conroy and Carl Severson who have previously worked for Ferret Music and Warner Music Group. Carl Severson is also known as a longtime member of hardcore act NORA.

Good Fight Music

Good Fight Music is the record label department of Good Fight Entertainment which features hardcore punk and heavy metal bands. The first albums released through Good Fight Music were Bears, Mayors, Scraps & Bones by Cancer Bats and The Farthest Reaches by Son of Aurelius which were released on April 13, 2010. In November 2010, Good Fight acquired the rights to release seven of In Flames' earlier albums in the United States.

Bands
Current artists
 Assassins 
 Auras
 The Banner
 Chokehold
 Conditions
 The Contortionist
 Cryptodira
 Dark Sermon
 Disembodied
 End
 Enterprise Earth
 Extinction A. D.
 Funeral for a Friend
 Great American Ghost
 Harvest
 Hollow Earth 
 In Flames (Classic catalog, North America only)
 Ion Dissonance
 Legion
 Like Monroe
 More Than a Thousand
 MyChildren MyBride
 Nasty
 Nora
 Pyralis
 Racetraitor
 Rarity
 Skyharbor
 Son of Aurelius
 SOS
 Winds of Plague
 Within the Ruins
 '68
 Through the Eyes of the Dead
 Vile Ones
 Yashira

Former artists
 Cancer Bats
 The Chariot
 Fit for an Autopsy
 I Am Abomination
 No Bragging Rights
 Reflections
 Rosaline
Terror
 This or the Apocalypse
 Trapped Under Ice
While She Sleeps

Good Fight Sports athletes
 Tom Asta
 Chris Cole
 Alyonka Larionov
 Alec Martinez
 James van Riemsdyk
 Dakota Roche
 Mike Vallely

References

External links

American independent record labels
Hardcore record labels
Heavy metal record labels